The Future of Åland is a separatist political party on Åland. As a member of the European Free Alliance, the goal of the party is to make Åland an independent state.

At the 2003 elections, the party won 6.5% of popular votes and 2 out of 30 seats.  In the 21 October 2007 parliamentary elections, the party won 8.1% of the popular vote and 2 out of 30 seats. In the 2011 elections, the party won 9.7% of the vote and 3 out of 30 seats. In the 2015 elections, the party won 7.4% and 2 seats. In the 2019 elections the party won only one of the 30 seats.

See also
Political parties and elections in Åland

References

External links
Official website 

Political parties in Åland
Secessionist organizations in Europe
Pro-independence parties
National conservative parties
European Free Alliance
Centrist parties in Finland